Robert Joseph (born May 5, 1978) is a former Haitian professional basketball player who played in the Spanish basketball league system for twelve seasons.

Early years
Joseph was born in Port-au-Prince, Haiti. He emigrated to the United States and played college basketball at Union University in Tennessee, a school which has become a haven for many top Haitian talent over the years. Joseph broke David Robinson’s single season college shot block record and was named NAIA Player of the Year.

Professional
Joseph played in the Liga ACB, which is the first league in Spain. He is considered to be one of the best professional basketball leagues in the world behind the NBA.

References

1979 births
Living people
Básquet Coruña players
Haitian men's basketball players
Centers (basketball)